Maariv is a Jewish prayer service held in the evening or night. Maariv may also refer to:

 Maariv (newspaper), an Israeli newspaper
 Maariv Aravim, the first blessing before the Shema prayer and generally the opening prayer during Maariv

See also
 Maarif (disambiguation)
 Ma'rib, a city in Yemen